Anne Leonard may refer to:
Ann Leonard (born 1969), Irish politician
Anne Lennard, Countess of Sussex (1661 - 1721/2), formerly Lady Anne Palmer, alias Fitzroy